Nganzun is a town in the Mandalay Region of central Myanmar. It is the seat of Nganzun Township.

External links
Satellite map at Maplandia.com

Populated places in Mandalay Region
Township capitals of Myanmar